Aleksandr Sverchinskiy (born 16 September 1991) is a Belarusian former footballer.

Honours
Minsk
Belarusian Cup winner: 2012–13

External links

Profile at pressball.by

1991 births
Living people
Belarusian footballers
Belarusian expatriate footballers
Expatriate footballers in Slovakia
Expatriate footballers in Armenia
Slovak Super Liga players
FC Minsk players
MFK Zemplín Michalovce players
FC Dinamo Minsk players
FC Isloch Minsk Raion players
FC Gandzasar Kapan players
Association football defenders